is a Japanese screenwriter, director and manga artist. She is one of the most prolific writers currently working in the anime industry. She won the 16th Animation Kobe Award.

Personal life
Okada was born in Chichibu. She was often bullied at school and skipped days to deal with social anxiety. After leaving middle school, she would spend most of her time confined at home. In spite of this, her proficiency at writing helped to get her into high school, although her social anxiety remained a problem. Nobody had high hopes for her, and as she was graduating, she was constantly told that she “wouldn't survive in the real world.” Okada enrolled at the Tokyo Amusement Media School to study about games.

Career
Through her studies, Okada developed a passion for screenwriting, but found it difficult due to anxieties. Her earliest jobs included creating scenarios for direct-to-video pornography and transcribing interviews for a magazine. It was through this latter job that she met Tetsurō Amino, who asked her to contribute some of her ideas for the plot of DT Eightron. She went on to write the script for five episodes, and the connection with Amino helped in kickstarting her career. Okada pitched an idea for her first original anime, based on her experience. The screenplay was never published, but several elements of it would be used in some of her works. After several years, her reputation within the industry had grown considerably, with the screenplay for numerous successful series. Okada wrote the script for her directorial debut anime film Maquia: When the Promised Flower Blooms. It was well received by critics and was awarded the prize for best animated film at the 21st Shanghai International Film Festival.

Works

Manga 
O Maidens in Your Savage Season (2016–2019; writer)

Television
DT Eightron (1998; screenplay, eps. 9, 15, 17, 20, 22)
Angel Tales (2001; screenplay, eps. 1-13)
Crush Gear Nitro (2003; screenplay, eps. 9, 17, 19, 30-31, 40-41, 48)
Hamtaro (2003; screenplay, eps. 146, 152, 157, 165, 172, 177, 185, 191, 197, 202, 204, 208, 217, 223, 228, 233, 238-239, 243, 248, 255)
Popolocrois (2003; screenplay, eps. 5, 9, 17, 20, 24)
Diamond Daydreams (2004; screenplay, eps. 3-4, 7)
Kyo kara Maoh! (2004; screenplay, eps. 5, 11-12, 17, 22, 28, 32, 39, 44, 47, 49, 52, 58, 61, 65, 70)
Rozen Maiden (2004; screenplay, eps. 4, 8-9)
Basilisk (2005; screenplay, eps. 3, 6, 12, 14, 16, 20)
Canvas 2: Niji Iro no Sketch (2005; scenario, eps. 3, 5, 11, 14, 22)
Animal Yokochō (2005; scenario, eps. 62, 66, 78, 92)
Rozen Maiden: Träumend (2005; screenplay, eps. 4, 9, 11)
Fate/stay night (2006; screenplay, eps. 4, 9, 12, 16, 20, 24)
Aria – The Natural (2006; screenplay, eps. 9-10, 14, 23)
Simoun (2006; screenplay, eps. 12-13, 15-16, 18, 20-21, 23-24)
Sasami: Magical Girls Club (2006; series composition)
Sasami: Magical Girls Club Season 2 (2006; series composition)
Red Garden (2006; screenplay, eps. 5, 8, 13, 17-18, 21-22)
Venus to Mamoru (2006; series composition)
Sketchbook ~full color'S~ (2007; series composition)
Kodomo no Jikan (2007; series composition)
True Tears (2008; series composition)
Vampire Knight (2008; series composition)
Vampire Knight Guilty (2008; series composition)
Toradora! (2008; series composition)
Black Butler (2008; series composition)
Kyo kara Maoh! 3rd Series (2008; screenplay, ep. 22)
Canaan (2009; series composition)
The Book of Bantorra (2009; series composition)
Darker Than Black: Gemini of the Meteor (2009; series composition)
Black Butler II (2010; series composition)
Otome Yōkai Zakuro (2010; series composition)
Gosick (2011; series composition)
Fractale (2011; series composition)
Wandering Son (2011; series composition)
Anohana: The Flower We Saw That Day (2011; series composition)
Hanasaku Iroha (2011; series composition)
Aquarion Evol (2012; series composition)
Black Rock Shooter (2012; series composition)
Lupin the Third: The Woman Called Fujiko Mine (2012; series composition)
AKB0048 (2012; series composition)
Blast of Tempest (2012; series composition)
The Pet Girl of Sakurasou (2012; series composition)
AKB0048 next stage (2013; series composition)
Ganbare! Lulu Lolo - Tiny Twin Bears (2013; screenplay, eps. 6-10, 21-23)
Nagi no Asukara (2013; series composition)
Selector Infected WIXOSS (2014; series composition)
M3: The Dark Metal (2014; series composition)
Selector Spread WIXOSS (2014; series composition)
Gourmet Girl Graffiti (2015; series composition)
Mobile Suit Gundam: Iron-Blooded Orphans (2015; series composition)
Kiznaiver (2016; series composition)
The Lost Village (2016; series composition)
Dragon Pilot: Hisone and Masotan (2018; series composition)
Rinshi!! Ekoda-chan (2019; screenplay, ep. 2)
O Maidens in Your Savage Season (2019; series composition, original creator)
Oni: Thunder God's Tale (2022; screenplay)

Original video animation
Dead Girls (2007; screenplay)
Kodomo no Jikan: Anata ga Watashi ni Kureta Mono (2007; series composition)
Kodomo no Jikan Nigakki (2009; series composition)
Kodomo no Jikan: Kodomo no Natsu Jikan (2011; series composition)
Rurouni Kenshin: New Kyoto Arc (2011; series composition)
Koitabi: True Tours Nanto (2013; series composition)
Zetsumetsu Kigu Shojo Amazing Twins (2014; series composition)
Winter Oath, Summer Festival, Takeo Ōkusu (2016; screenplay)
Cup's Promise, First Love of Arita (2016; screenplay)

Anime films
Kaiketsu Zorori: Quest For The Mysterious Treasure (2006; screenplay)
Cinnamon the Movie (2007; screenplay)
Kaiketsu Zorori: Uchu no Yusha-tachi (2015; screenplay)
The Anthem of the Heart (2015; screenplay)
Maquia: When the Promised Flower Blooms (2018; director, screenplay)
 Her Blue Sky (2019; screenplay)
 Kimi dake ni Motetainda (2019; screenplay)
A Whisker Away (2020; screenplay)
Alice and Therese's Illusion Factory (TBA; director, screenplay)

Live-action films
My Teacher (2017; screenplay)
Ankoku Joshi (2017; screenplay)
 The Flowers of Evil (2019; screenplay)

References

External links
 
 

1976 births
21st-century Japanese women writers
Anime directors
Anime screenwriters
Japanese women film directors
Japanese women screenwriters
Living people
People from Saitama Prefecture
21st-century screenwriters